All Beauty Must Die is the fourth and final studio album by the German symphonic metal band Krypteria, released on April 22, 2011.

In the weeks before the release, three songs from the album were made available for free download through the official Krypteria website by signing up for their newsletter. On March 27, a music video for the track "Live To Fight Another Day" followed.

On March 9, the band announced on their web site, that for the first time in their band history, the album would contain guest performances by friends of the band. This includes co-lead vocals by Doro on "Victoria" and co-lead guitar by Tobias Exxel of Edguy on the song "Higher".

"The Eye Collector" also samples the "Moonlight Sonata" by Ludwig van Beethoven.

Reception

All Beauty Must Die peaked at position 24 in the German album charts.

A review by the German Sonic Seducer magazine lauded the album's mix of fast uptempo tracks and slow "atmospheric" pieces as well as the guitar riffs. Also Metal Hammer was positive about the dynamics and the quality of the riffs but criticised the contrast between singer Cho's bright voice and the deep guitar sound.

Track listing

Credits
 Ji-In Cho - Lead vocals & piano
 Chris Siemons - Guitar
 Frank Stumvoll - Bass
 S.C. Kuschnerus - Drums
 Tobias Exxel - Co-lead guitar on "Higher" 
 Doro - Co-lead vocals on "Victoria"

References

Krypteria albums
2011 albums